Inari Sámi ( or ) is a Sámi language spoken by the Inari Sámi of Finland. It has approximately 300 speakers, the majority of whom are middle-aged or older and live in the municipality of Inari. According to the Sámi Parliament of Finland, 269 persons used Inari Sámi as their first language. It is the only Sámi language that is spoken exclusively in Finland. The language is classified as being seriously endangered, as few children learn it; however, more and more children are learning it in language nests. In 2018, Inari Sámi had about 400 speakers; due to revival efforts, the number had increased.

History

The first book in Inari Sámi was Anar sämi kiela aapis kirje ja doctor Martti Lutherus Ucca katkismus, which was written and translated by Edvard Wilhelm Borg in 1859. The written history of modern Inari Sámi, however, is said to begin with Lauri Arvid Itkonen's translation of the history of the Bible in 1906, although he had already translated some other books into Inari Sámi (Martin Luther and John Charles Ryles). After that, Inari Sámi was mainly published in books written by linguists, in particular Frans Äimä and Erkki Itkonen. For many years, very little literature was written in Inari Sámi, although Sämitigge has funded and published a lot of books, etc., in recent years.

Since 1992, Finland's Sámi have had the right to interact with officials in their own language in areas where they have traditionally lived: Enontekiö, Utsjoki, Inari and the northern part of Sodankylä as official policy favors the conservation of the language. All announcements in Inari, which is the only officially quadrilingual municipality in Finland, must be made in Finnish, North Sámi, Inari Sámi and Skolt Sámi. Only about 10% of the public servants in the area, however, can serve the Inari Sámi-speaking population in Inari Sámi, so Finnish is used by the remaining 90%.

In 1986, the Anarâškielâ servi (Inari Sámi Language Association) was founded to promote the language and its use. The association publishes numerous books, textbooks, a calendar, etc., in Inari Sámi. They have established a language immersion program in 1997 for 3- to 6-year-old children in a day care in Inari and Ivalo. In 2007, the association started publishing an Inari Sámi newspaper called Kierâš online.

A new phenomenon is the use of Inari Sámi in rap songs by Mikkâl Morottaja, whose stage name is Amoc. Morottaja published the first full-length Inari Sámi rap CD in the world on 6 February 2007, the Sámi National Day.

Geographic distribution
Along with Finnish, Skolt Sámi and Northern Sámi, Inari Sámi is one of the four official languages in the municipality of Inari, in particular in the following villages located on the shore of Lake Inari (the Inari Sámi name for the village is enclosed in parentheses):

Nellim (Njellim)
Ivalo (Avveel)
Menesjärvi (Menišjävri)
Repojoki (Riemâšjuuhâ)
Tirro (Mosshâš)
the village of Inari (Aanaar markkân)
Kaamanen (Kaamâs)
Aksujärvi (Ákšujävri)
 Syysjärvi (Čovčjävri)
Iijärvi (Ijjävri)
Sevettijärvi (Čevetjävri)
Partakko (Päärtih)

Phonology

Consonants

Vowels

Notes:
 The central open vowel  was distinguished only in older Inari Sámi. In the modern language, it has merged into the front vowel .

Prosody

Inari Sámi, like the other Samic languages, has fixed word-initial stress. Syllables are furthermore divided into feet, usually consisting of two syllables each, and with secondary stress on the first syllable of every foot. In the other Samic languages the last syllable in a word with an odd number of syllables is not assigned to a foot. In Inari Sámi, however, two important changes in the early development of Inari Sámi have changed this structure, making the prosodic rhythm quite different:
 In words with an odd number of syllables, the last two syllables were converted into a foot, leaving the third-last syllable as a foot of its own.
 The apocope of certain final vowels, in words of three syllables or more, reduced this new final foot to a single syllable.
Consequently, Inari Sámi distinguishes prosodically between words that originally ended in a vowel but have undergone apocope, and words that already ended in a consonant in Proto-Samic.

This rearrangement of the foot structure has an effect on the length of vowels and consonants.

Orthography

Inari Sámi is written using the Latin script. The alphabet currently used for Inari Sámi was made official in 1996 and stands as follows:

The phonetic values are the same as in Karelian, and đ represents the voiced dental fricative (in English "the"). Q/q, W/w, X/x, Å/å, Ö/ö are also used in words of foreign origin. Á was traditionally pronounced in the middle of a and ä, but in modern Inari Sámi the distinction between á and ä is nonexistent. In writing, Á and ä are nevertheless considered separate characters. Ä is used in: 
 the first syllable of a word, when there is an e or i in a second syllable of the same word,
 a word of only one syllable (although á is also used), or
 the diphthong iä (but not in the diphthong uá).

Marks used in reference works

In dictionaries, grammars and other linguistic works, the following additional marks are used. These are not used in normal writing.
 A dot is placed below consonants to indicate a half-long consonant: đ̣, j̣, ḷ, ṃ, ṇ, ṇj, ŋ̣, ṛ, ṿ. Some works may instead print the letter in bold, or use a capital letter.
 A vertical line ˈ (U+02C8 MODIFIER LETTER VERTICAL LINE), typewriter apostrophe or other similar mark is placed between consonants to indicate that the preceding consonant is long, and the preceding diphthong is short. It is only used when a diphthong precedes.
 The same mark placed between a diphthong and a consonant indicates that the diphthong is short.
 The same mark placed between a single vowel and a consonant indicates that the vowel is half-long.

Grammar

Consonant gradation

Consonant gradation is a pattern of alternations between pairs of consonants that appears in the inflection of words. Consonant gradation in Inari Sámi is more complex than that of other Sámi languages, because of the effects of the unique stress pattern of Inari Sámi. Like in other Sámi languages, there is a distinction between the strong and weak grade, but a second factor is whether the consonants appear in the middle of a foot (FM) or in the juncture between two feet (FJ). In the latter case, consonants are often lengthened.

Umlaut

Umlaut is a phenomenon in Inari Sámi, whereby the vowel in the second syllable affects the quality of the vowel in the first.

The following table lists the Inari Sámi outcomes of the Proto-Samic first-syllable vowel, for each second-syllable vowel.

As can be seen, several of the Proto-Samic vowels have identical outcomes before certain second-syllable vowels. Only before Proto-Samic *ē are all vowels distinguishable. For example, Proto-Samic *oa and *ë both appear before *ë as o, while *o and *u both appear as u. In cases where the second-syllable vowel changes, it is necessary to know which series the vowel of a particular word belongs to. For example,  "to drink" has the third-person singular present indicative form , while  "to end" has ; the former originates from Proto-Samic *u, the latter from *o.

A second kind of umlaut also occurs, which operates in reverse: when the first syllable contains a (originating from Proto-Samic *ë) and the second syllable contains á, the second-syllable vowel is backed to a.

Nouns

Inari Sámi has nine cases, although the genitive and accusative are often the same:

Nominative
Genitive
Accusative
Locative
Illative
Comitative
Abessive
Essive
Partitive

The partitive appears to be a highly unproductive case in that it seems to only be used in the singular. In addition, unlike Finnish, Inari Sámi does not make use of the partitive case for objects of transitive verbs. Thus "" could translate into Finnish as either "" (English: "I'm eating (all of) the bread") or "" (I'm eating (some) bread, or generally, I eat bread); this telicity contrast is mandatory in Finnish.

Pronouns

The personal pronouns have three numbers: singular, plural and dual. The following table contains personal pronouns in the nominative and genitive/accusative cases.

The next table demonstrates the declension of a personal pronoun I/we (dual)/we (plural) in the various cases:

Verbs

Person

Inari Sámi verbs conjugate for three grammatical persons:

first person
second person
third person

Mood

Inari Sámi has five grammatical moods:

indicative
imperative
conditional
potential
optative

Grammatical number

Inari Sámi verbs conjugate for three grammatical numbers:

singular
dual
plural

Tense

Inari Sámi has two simple tenses:

past
non-past

and two compound tenses:

perfect
Pluperfect

Verbal nouns

Negative verb

Inari Sámi, like Finnish and the other Sámi languages, has a negative verb. In Inari Sámi, the negative verb conjugates according to mood (indicative, imperative and optative), person (1st, 2nd, 3rd) and number (singular, dual and plural).

References

General

Itkonen, Erkki. Inarilappisches Wörterbuch. Lexica societatis fenno-ugricae: 20. Suomalais-ugrilainen seura. Helsinki. .
Morottaja, Matti. Anarâškielâ ravvuuh – inarinsaamen kieliopas Kotimaisten kielten keskuksen verkkojulkaisuja: 56. Helsinki 2018. Näköisjulkaisu painetusta teoksesta (2007). .
Taarna Valtonen and Jussi Ylikoski and Ante Aikio. 2022. Aanaar (Inari) Saami. In Marianne Bakró-Nagy, Johanna Laakso and Elena Skribnik (eds.), The Oxford guide to the Uralic languages, 178-195. Oxford: Oxford University Press., ISSN 2323-3370.
Olthuis, Marja-Liisa. Kielâoppâ. Inari : Sämitigge, 2000.
Sammallahti, Pekka. Morottaja, Matti. Säämi-suoma sänikirje. Inarinsaamelais-suomalainen sanakirja. Girjegiisá. Ykkösoffset Oy, Vaasa 1993. .
Østmo, Kari. Sämikielâ vieres kiellân vuáðuškoovlâst. Helsinki : Valtion painatuskeskus, 1988.

External links

 Say it in Saami Yle's colloquial Northern Sami-Inari Sami-Skolt Sami-English phrasebook online
Brief history of Inari Sami
Salminen, Tapani. UNESCO Red Book on Endangered Languages. 1993.
Kimberli Mäkäräinen A minute vocabulary (Inari Sami-English) (233 words)
Names of birds found in Sápmi in a number of languages, including Skolt Sami and English. Search function only works with Finnish input though.
Inari Sami language resources at Giellatekno
Clip about keeping Inari Sami alive (requires RealPlayer)
The Inari Sami Language by Toivonen and Nelson
Hans Morottaja speaks about himself, etc. in Inari Sami
The Children's TV series Binnabánnaš in Inari Sami
Pustaveh anarâškielân - Aakkoset inarinsaameksi Inari Sami alphabet by the Finnish Sami Parliament
 

Endangered languages of Europe
Endangered Uralic languages
Inari, Finland
Inari Sámi people
Languages of Finland
Eastern Sámi languages